Volha Uladzimirauna Klimava (born 5 November 1995) is a Belarusian sprint canoeist.

She participated at the 2018 ICF Canoe Sprint World Championships, winning a medal.

References

External links

Living people
1995 births
Belarusian female canoeists
ICF Canoe Sprint World Championships medalists in Canadian
Canoeists at the 2019 European Games
European Games medalists in canoeing
European Games silver medalists for Belarus
People from Mir, Belarus
Sportspeople from Grodno Region
21st-century Belarusian women